= Freo =

Freo may refer to:

- Freyja, the Norse goddess
- Fremantle, a port town in Western Australia
  - Fremantle Football Club, a team in the Australian Football League commonly referred to as the "Freo Dockers"
